The fire in the Gdansk Shipyard hall took place on 24 November 1994 during a concert by the band Golden Life in the Gdansk Shipyard Hall in Gdańsk. As a result of the injuries 7 people died.

Incident 
On 24 November 1994, in the performance hall at Jan z Kolna Street, a music event was taking place - a concert of the Golden Life band, and later a live broadcast of the MTV awards was to be shown. About 2000 people came to the concert - mostly young people (13-20 years old). One hour after the Golden Life musicians left the stage (about 20:50), a fire was noticed on a wooden stand in the back of the hall. At first, no one was alarmed - it was thought to be a light effect. Security tried to nip the fire in the bud, but to no avail. Very quickly the fire started to spread, the curtain caught fire and the fire reached the ceiling. When the lights went out, panic broke out. Everyone rushed to the only known exit from the hall - the main exit, which was not fully accessible. People fell over each other and were scalded by the hot air. Among the fatalities of the fire were two people: 13-year-old Dominika Powszuk trampled by a fleeing crowd, and Sky Orunia TV operator Wojciech Klawinowski, who returned to the burning hall to carry TV equipment out of it. Another five people died in hospitals as a result of serious injuries, including two security guards who had earlier carried unconscious people out of the burning hall. About 300 people were injured, the most severely burned were taken to the Specialist Hospital for Burns Treatment in Siemianowice Śląskie.

The cause of the fire 
The cause of the fire was arson, the perpetrator was never identified. The organisers of the event were charged with failing to ensure unobstructed emergency exits and bypassing basic fire safety rules.

References 

1994 fires in Europe
1994 in Poland
History of Gdańsk
November 1994 events in Europe
Events in Gdańsk
Fires in Poland